Skyharbor Airport  was a privately owned, public-use airport in Dallas County, Alabama, United States. It was located five nautical miles (5.8 mi, 9.3 km) southwest of the central business district of Selma, Alabama. Since 2011, official FAA records state "Airport closed indefinitely."

Facilities and aircraft 
It has one runway designated 6/24 with a turf surface measuring 2,500 by 170 feet (762 x 52 m).

For the 12-month period ending September 19, 1996, the airport had an average of 129 general aviation aircraft operations per week. At that time there were 14 aircraft based at this airport: 93% single-engine and 7% multi-engine.

References

External links 
 Aerial photo as of 30 January 1998 from USGS The National Map

Defunct airports in Alabama
Airports in Dallas County, Alabama
Defunct privately owned airports